The following is a list of presidents of Reynosa Municipality in Tamaulipas state, Mexico. The municipality includes the city of Reynosa.

List of officials

 José Cruz Contreras, 1961-1963 
 Fidel Treviño González, 1962-1964 
 Manuel Tarrega Guevara, 1965-1967
 Rodolfo Garza Cantú, 1968-1970
 Rafael Sierra Cantú, 1971-1973
 Manuel Garza González, 1972-1974
 Romeo Flores Salinas, 1975-1977
 Ernesto Gómez Lira, 1978-1980
 Enfrían Martínez Rendón, 1981-1983
 Miguel Valdez Revilla, 1984-1986
 Ernesto Gómez Lira, 1987-1989
 Ramón Pérez García, 1990-1992
 Rigoberto Armando Garza Cantú, 1993-1995
 Oscar Luebbert Gutiérrez, 1996-1998, 2008-2010
 Luis Gerardo Higareda Adam, 1999-1999
 Humberto Valdez Richaud, 1999-2001
 Serapio Cantú Barragán, 2002-2004
 Francisco Javier García Cabeza de Vaca, 2005-2007
 Miguel Angel Villarreal Ongay 2007-2007
 Everardo Villarreal Salinas 2011-2013
 , 2013-2016
 Maki Esther Ortiz, 2016-2021
 Carlos Víctor Peña Ortiz, 2021-2022
 José Alfonso Peña Rodríguez, 2022-

See also
 
 Reynosa history
 List of presidents of Reynosa Municipality (in Spanish)

References

Reynosa
Politicians from Tamaulipas
History of Tamaulipas